Momisis is a genus of longhorn beetles of the subfamily Lamiinae.

 Momisis aegrota Pascoe, 1867
 Momisis borneana Vives & Heffern, 2012
 Momisis longicornis (Pic, 1912)
 Momisis longzhouensis Hua, 1982
 Momisis melanura Gahan, 1901
 Momisis monticola Breuning, 1956
 Momisis nicobarica Gardner, 1936
 Momisis singularis Ritsema, 1888
 Momisis submonticola Breuning, 1968

References

Astathini
Cerambycidae genera